NGC 343 are a pair of interacting galaxies in the constellation Cetus. It was discovered in 1886 by Frank Muller. It was described by Dreyer as "extremely faint, very small, irregularly round, suddenly brighter middle and nucleus (perhaps a star?)."

References

0343
?
Cetus (constellation)
Interacting galaxies
133741